The Park City Main Street Historic District is a historic district in Park City, Utah, United States, that is listed on the National Register of Historic Places.

Description

The district includes 47 contributing buildings on  along most of Park City's Main Street through its business section, plus part of Heber Avenue.  All were built after the fire of June 19, 1898.  The buildings include Queen Anne, Mission/Spanish Revival, and Victorian architecture. It was argued to be "the best remaining metal mining town business district in the state of Utah, exhibiting unique historical and architectural qualities."

The district was listed on the National Register of Historic Places March 26, 1979.

See also

 National Register of Historic Places listings in Summit County, Utah

References

External links

Buildings and structures in Park City, Utah
Historic districts on the National Register of Historic Places in Utah
Mission Revival architecture in Utah
National Register of Historic Places in Summit County, Utah
Queen Anne architecture in Utah